Nikola Đuretić (born Osijek, Croatia, July 24, 1949) is a Croatian writer and publisher. At the age of five he moved to Zagreb where he graduated in English studies and Comparative Literature. He published his first short stories in the magazine "Polet" in 1968. From 1975 until 1978 he worked as an editor in publishing. In March 1978 he went into exile. For more than twenty years he lived in London, UK, where he worked as a program assistant and senior producer with the BBC. Upon retiring from the BBC in 1999 he returned to Croatia. He is a member of the Croatian Writers' Association and Matrix Croatica. For years he's been a member of the Organizing Committee of the Zagreb Literary Talks which he presided upon from 2008 until 2011.

Works

Đuretić has published thus far more than twenty books of prose, poetry, short stories, essays and feuilleton. He also translated works of the most prominent contemporary English and Irish writers (Salman Rushdie, Penelope Lively, Julian Barnes, Kazuo Ishiguro, Ian McEwan, Beryl Bainbridge, Louis de Bernieres, Hugo Williams, Edward Gordon Craig, Desmond Egan and others).

Bibliography

Short stories and novels:
 Vragolovi, 1974
 Vrijeme bijelih dana, 1978
 Suze Martina Jesenskog, 1997
 Lovac sjena, 2010
 Almanah smrti i nestajanja, 2011 (2013)
 Almanac of Death and Disappearance, 2013
 Posljednja predaja, 2016
 Izabrana djela 1-6, 2019
 Knjiga opasnih pripovijesti, 2019

Poetry:
 Kao zvuk otoka, 2006
 Male smrti ptica, 2008
 Gdje počinju ceste, 2009
 Raspuko se nar, 2011
 Osveta mimoza, 2011
 Crtež vedrine, 2011
 Jesenji prozor, 2012
 Lahor u šašu, 2012
 Plinska lanterna, 2013
 Zvuk tišine, 2014
 Ždral od papira, 2014
 Odlazak/Oproštaj, 2017
 Put u jesen, 2018

Essays and feuilleton:
 Kazališni putokazi i krajputaši, 1996
 Albionske razglednice, 1996
 Iskreno Vaš... zapisi s Otoka, 2004 (2011)
 Između dodira - Bilješke za kroniku jednoga egzila, 2005
 Zavičajni oblog, 2010
 Nerazumni zapisi, 2013
 Ka totalnom teatru, 2015

Awards

 Merit Award - ITO EN Oi Ocha New Haiku Contest, Japan, 2018
 Josip and Ivan Kozarac Award, 2017
 Croatian Academy of Sciences and Arts Award - for the highest scientific and artistic achievements in the Republic of Croatia, 2016
 Visoka žuta žita Award - for the overall literary opus and lasting contribution to Croatian Literature, 2016
 "Dubravko Horvatić Award" - Best Short Story, 2015
 Runner up at the International haiku competition "Vladimir Devide", Japan, 2015
 "Duhovno hrašće" - Best book of poetry for year 2013
 Commendation at the International haiku competition "Vladimir Devide", Japan, 2013
 Commendation - Polish International Haiku Competition 2013
 "Ksaver Šandor Gjalski" Award for the best book of prose for year 2012
 Order of Danica hrvatska s likom Marka Marulića - for contribution to Croatian culture, 1998
 "Marko Marulić" Award for the best first book of short stories, 1974

References

 Slobodan Prosperov Novak: Povijest hrvatske književnosti (Od Bašćanske ploče do danas), Zagreb, Golden marketing, 2003. 
 Hrvatsko slovo, Kritička svijest ne dopire do javnosti, 27. svibnja 2011.
 DHK
 Osobna web-stranica (https://web.archive.org/web/20120108095527/http://webograd.tportal.hr/nduretic/home)
 Suvremena engleska priča, Republika 59 (2003.), 2, Zagreb, str. 3-66

Writers from Zagreb
Croatian publishers (people)
1949 births
Living people
Croatian expatriates in the United Kingdom